Jules Levy (April 24, 1838 – November 28, 1903) was a cornetist, teacher and composer.

Biography
Born in London, England, he reportedly began his study of the cornet with only its mouthpiece; his family could not afford the instrument itself. After migrating to the United States, he began a significant musical career as a cornet soloist and was billed as "The World's Greatest Cornetist". He was widely regarded as a foremost player, although the claim of world's greatest has some challengers. He was a member of Patrick Gilmore's band for several years, performing with them at the Centennial Exposition in Philadelphia in 1876. He was also a tester and promoter for C.G. Conn, a manufacturer of musical instruments.

Levy performed many pieces, among the most famous being "Una Voce" by Rossini, "Carnival of Venice", "Grand Russian Fantasia" and, his favorite, "Whirlwind Polka". He was arguably the first cornetist to be recorded, having participated in an early public demonstration of Thomas Edison's tinfoil phonograph. He later recorded commercially for Victor Records and Columbia Records.

His son, Jules Levy, Jr., was also an accomplished cornetist and trumpeter. He recorded from 1919 to 1932, often with groups led by Joseph Samuels. Levy was bigamously married to the actress Mary “Minnie” Conway in the 1870s. Their son, Frederick Conway Levy, was the popular stage and screen actor, Conway Tearle.

Jules Levy died at age 65 in Chicago, Illinois.

Notes

External links
 Jules Levy at the Discography of American Historical Recordings
 Well Known Soloists - includes a profile of Jules Levy

1838 births
1903 deaths
English cornetists